Robert F. Newmyer (May 30, 1956 – December 12, 2005) was an American film producer, both commercial and independent.

Biography
Robert Frederick Newmyer (Bobby) was born on May 30, 1956 in Washington, DC to James and Virginia Newmyer. He graduated from Sidwell Friends School in 1974, and received a bachelor's degree in economics from Swarthmore College in 1978 and afterward worked as a real estate developer in Telluride, Colorado. In 1982 he received a master's degree in business administration from Harvard Business School in 1982.

According to long-time friend, documentary filmmaker Eames Yates, "Just before he graduated, he saw Spielberg's E.T.''' and he came out and said, 'That's what I want to do'." Newmyer went on to hold a variety of positions at Columbia Pictures, before becoming a vice president of production and acquisitions.

Newmyer and Jeffrey Silver formed "Outlaw Productions", the name derived from  Newmyer's favorite Clint Eastwood character, the outlaw Josey Wales. The production company had, for a time, a long-term deal with Warner Brothers. Chairwoman of Sony Motion Pictures Group, Amy Pascal said,"Bobby was a true maverick and a true risk-taker.

Personal life
Newmyer was married to wife Deborah Jelin Newmyer for nineteen years. They have four children, Sofi, Teddy, James and Billi, all of Los Angeles; his parents, and his two sisters, Elsa Newmyer of the District of Columbia and Lory Newmyer of Hull, Massachusetts.

Paramount producer, Lorenzo di Bonaventura, who worked with Newmyer at Warner Bros., recalled Newmyer's love of whitewater rafting, "Bobby looked at movies as he looked at life: with a great sense of passion and a great sense of risk-taking."

Death
On December 12, 2005, Newmyer died at the age of 49 in Toronto, Ontario. Newmyer, a lifelong asthmatic, had a heart attack triggered by asthma, while working out in a health club. He was on location working on the film Breach.

In addition to the film Breach, at the time of his death, Newmyer had Santa Clause 3 in production, and Phat Girlz in postproduction. To finance the romantic comedy Phat Girlz, he put up nearly $3 million of his own money, liquidating assets and mortgaging his homes. According to his obituary in The New York Times, he said "I do find it terrifying and I would say, in waves, I am feeling, experiencing phenomenal stress for the past five or six months. I will clearly stay on this track until we finish this movie, exhibit it and it's sold to a distributor."

Legacy
Newmyer also had in development of a movie about the young boys forced to flee war-torn and famine-ridden Sudan, an idea that arose from a segment on 60 Minutes. He became an advocate for the young Sudanese immigrants, providing temporary accommodations for some of them in his home. Some of "the Lost Boys" gave the eulogy at his funeral. The Lost Boys of Sudan was in development for Paramount Pictures. (It was eventually released in 2014 by Warner Bros. as The Good Lie).

The Bobby Newmyer Memorial Fund was established to further his work with Sudanese refugees.

Awards
 1990 Independent Spirit Award (with John Hardy) for Sex, Lies, and Videotape'' (1989).

Outlaw Productions
Outlaw Productions is an American film production company founded in 1987 by the late Robert Newmyer and Jeffrey Silver. They have produced independent films as well as major studio features. In 2015, the President was Newmyer's widow, Deb Newmyer, an independent movie and television producer in her own right, who worked at Steven Spielberg's Amblin Entertainment for 12 years. In 2006, Deb Newmyer and her Outlaw company received a first look deal with Sony.

Filmography
He was a producer in all films unless otherwise noted.

Film

As an actor

Thanks

References

External links
 
 Outlaw Productions web site
 Outlaw Productions at IMDb

1956 births
2005 deaths
American film producers
Film production companies of the United States
Harvard Business School alumni
People from Washington, D.C.